I'm Old Fashioned is an album by Japanese saxophonist Sadao Watanabe with the Great Jazz Trio; pianist Hank Jones, bassist Ron Carter and drummer Tony Williams, recorded in 1976 for the Japanese East Wind label.

Reception

Allmusic awarded the album 4½ stars, stating: "This LP features Sadao Watanabe at his best."

Track listing
All compositions by Sadao Watanabe except as indicated
 "Confirmation" (Charlie Parker) - 4:55 	
 "Gary" - 4:32
 "Blues" (Billy Strayhorn) - 5:47
 "Episode" - 6:36
 "I Concentrate on You" (Cole Porter) - 5:57
 "Chelsea Bridge" (Strayhorn) - 5:52
 "I'm Old Fashioned" (Jerome Kern, Johnny Mercer) - 8:11
 "One for C" - 2:38

Personnel 
Sadao Watanabe - alto saxophone, flute
Hank Jones - piano
Ron Carter - bass
Tony Williams - drums

References 

1976 albums
Sadao Watanabe (musician) albums
Great Jazz Trio albums
East Wind Records albums